Okhahlamba Local Municipality is a municipality in the Uthukela District Municipality, KwaZulu-Natal, South Africa.

Society and culture

Museums, monuments and memorials

Spion Kop 

This large battlefield located some 30 km outside Ladysmith contains the mass graves of British soldiers, individual graves as well as a number of memorials, including a Boer memorial, British memorial, South Lancashire memorial and Imperial Light Infantry memorial.

Nature reserves

Spioenkop Nature Reserve 
 from Ladysmith is one of South Africa’s popular wildlife sanctuaries, Spioenkop Nature Reserve. This  reserve is home to animals such as the rhino, giraffe and zebra. The sporting activities that Spioenkop offers include hiking, horse riding, angling, yachting, water-skiing and power boating. Spioenkop is also supplies other parts of Gauteng with water because in Gauteng there is a shortage of water.

Main places
The 2001 census divided the municipality into the following main places:

Politics 

The municipal council consists of twenty-nine members elected by mixed-member proportional representation. Fifteen councillors are elected by first-past-the-post voting in fifteen wards, while the remaining fourteen are chosen from party lists so that the total number of party representatives is proportional to the number of votes received. In the 1 November 2021 the Inkatha Freedom Party (IFP) won a plurality of nine seats on the council. 

The following table shows the results of the election.

References

External links
 Official website

Local municipalities of the Uthukela District Municipality